Jennifer Lopez: Let's Get Loud is the first live long-form video by American recording artist and actress Jennifer Lopez, released in February 2003. The material is chosen from two concerts of the same name recorded at the Roberto Clemente Coliseum in Puerto Rico.

Track listing
 Introduction (music): Frankie Cutlass "Puerto Rico" Big Pun "Still Not a Player " 
"Let's Get Loud"
"Ain't It Funny"
"Cariño"
"Play"
"Feelin' So Good"
"I'm Real
"Dancer Introductions"
Medley: "Secretly" / "Theme from Mahogany (Do You Know Where You're Going To)"
"I Could Fall in Love" (Selena cover)
"Si Ya Se Acabó"
"Band Introductions"
Medley: "Waiting for Tonight" / "Walking on Sunshine"
"If You Had My Love"
"Love Don't Cost a Thing"
"Plenarriqueña"

DVD bonus features
"Welcome to Puerto Rico"

Certifications

References

2003 video albums
Live video albums
Jennifer Lopez albums

pt:Let's Get Loud